A choir and orchestra consisting of musicians and singers from many countries who come together for music-making and performances of major choral works, mainly during the annual Musique-Cordiale festival and events in France and Britain, including the Canterbury Festival. Recent performances (and recordings) have included the a cappella Mass by Frank Martin and the Mass in B minor by Johann Sebastian Bach.

External links
 Musique-Cordiale & L'Ensemble Cordial

French classical music groups
British classical music groups